Joanna or Joanne Cole may refer to:

Joanna Cole (author) (1944–2020), American writer of children's books
Joanna Cole (politician) (born 1948), American politician
Joanne Cole (1934–1985), British artist and illustrator

See also
Joanna Coles (born 1962), British editor
Joanne Coles (born 1992), English motorcycle racer